Ryan Fage (born 31 October 2003) is a French professional footballer who plays as a midfielder for Troyes II.

Professional career
Fage is a youth product of Troyes since the U14s. Fage made his professional debut with Troyes in a 1–0 Coupe de France loss to Auxerre on 19 January 2021. On 20 January 2022, he signed his first professional contract with Troyes.

References

External links
 
 Foot National Profile

2003 births
Living people
Sportspeople from Ivry-sur-Seine
French footballers
Association football midfielders
ES Troyes AC players
Championnat National 3 players